Chunni Lal Khetrapal (25 August 1937 – 21 July 2021) was an Indian chemical physicist and a vice chancellor of Allahabad University. He was known for his studies in chemical physics, particularly in the field of Nuclear magnetic resonance spectroscopy. He was an elected fellow of the Indian National Science Academy  and the National Academy of Sciences, India. The Council of Scientific and Industrial Research, the apex agency of the Government of India for scientific research, awarded him the Shanti Swarup Bhatnagar Prize for Science and Technology, one of the highest Indian science awards, in 1982, for his contributions to chemical sciences.

Biography 

C. L. Khetrapal, born on 25 August 1937 in the Indian state of Uttar Pradesh, did his college studies at Allahabad University from where he graduated in 1957 and completed his master's degree in 1959. He started his career by joining Atomic Energy Establishment Training School, Mumbai the same year, simultaneously doing his doctoral research at Mumbai University to secure a PhD in 1965. In between, he worked at Tata Institute of Fundamental Research for a while and moved to Switzerland where he did his post-doctoral studies at the University of Basel from 1967 till 1969 when he shifted his base to the US to work at Liquid Crystal Institute of Kent State University as a research assistant. He returned to India in 1973 and joined Raman Research Institute as an assistant professor where he spent over eleven years till his move to the Indian Institute of Science as a professor and the head of the Sophisticated Instruments Facility in 1984. On his superannuation from service in 1998, he was appointed the vice chancellor of Allahabad University. When his tenure ended in 2001, he joined Sanjay Gandhi Postgraduate Institute of Medical Sciences as a distinguished professor for a five-year term (2001–06) and also held the directorship of Centre of Biomedical Magnetic Resonance, Lucknow, an autonomous research centre of the Government of Uttar Pradesh. In between, he had two stints at National Institutes of Health as a visiting scientist during 1979–80 and in 1984.

Legacy 
Using nuclear magnetic resonance spectroscopy (NMR), Khetrapal studied the molecules orientation in the nematic phase of liquid crystals, the non-planar distortions in peptides in the liquid phase and weak molecular interactions involved in hydrogen bonding. Apart from pioneering NMR studies in India, he established Institute of Interdisciplinary Studies and Institute of Professional Studies at Allahabad University. His contributions are also reported behind the establishment of the National Centre on NMR in Bangalore. He has published a number of articles and books, besides contributing chapters to books published by others including the 8-volume Encyclopedia of Nuclear Magnetic Resonance. He was one of the founders of the National Magnetic Resonance Society and the Centre of Biomedical Magnetic Resonance and served as the first president of the former and was an incumbent director of the latter.

Awards and honors 
The Council of Scientific and Industrial Research awarded Deb the Shanti Swarup Bhatnagar Prize, one of the highest Indian science awards, in 1982. He is also a recipient of the C. V. Raman Award of the University Grants Commission of India (1996), Goyal Prize (1996), P. C. Ray Memorial Medal of the Indian Science Congress Association (2002) and the Lifetime Achievement Award of the Indian Chemical Society (2005). He has delivered several award orations including the R. K. Asundi Memorial Lecture Award of the Indian National Science Academy in 1990 and N. R. Dhar Memorial Lecture Award of National Academy of Sciences, India in 2005. He was an elected fellow of the Indian National Science Academy and the National Academy of Sciences, India.

See also 
 Nuclear magnetic resonance spectroscopy

References 

Recipients of the Shanti Swarup Bhatnagar Award in Chemical Science
1937 births
2021 deaths
20th-century Indian chemists
Indian scientific authors
Fellows of the Indian National Science Academy
Scientists from Uttar Pradesh
Heads of universities and colleges in India
University of Allahabad alumni
University of Mumbai alumni
University of Basel alumni
Kent State University alumni
Academic staff of the Indian Institute of Science